Jean Denton, Baroness Denton of Wakefield, CBE (29 December 1935 – 5 February 2001) was a British businesswoman, racing driver and Conservative Party politician.

Life
Jean Moss was born in 1935, the daughter of Charles and Kathleen Moss (born Tuke), in Wakefield in Yorkshire. Her father worked at a hospital and her mother was a school cook. When she was 8 she represented Yorkshire in a child's version of the radio programme Round Britain Quiz. Moss attended Rothwell Grammar School near Leeds. When she was fourteen she had to take bed rest for a year to cure a kidney infection, despite this she won a scholarship as head girl to attend the London School of Economics. She gained a BSc in Economics in 1958. Having earned her Economics degree she joined the marketing department of the consumer company Procter & Gamble.

From 1961 to 1964 she was in the marketing department of the Economist Intelligence Unit (EIU) which was part of The Economist group of companies. At about this time she became interested in motor-racing. She learnt to drive late at the age of 26. Until 1966 she worked for IPC Media and until 1969 she led the Hotel and Catering Department of the University of Surrey. In her spare time she won the  1967 and 1968 title of Britain's Woman Racing Champion.

In 1969 she gave up work in marketing and management and devoted her time to driving. She took part and was the only woman to complete in a sports car the London-Sydney Marathon. The following year she was sponsored by Woman magazine to drive an Austin Maxi in the World Cup rally through Europe and South America.

She combined her interests and skills and took work as a senior manager in the British automotive industry. She was Marketing Director for the Hampstead Huxford Garage Group from 1972 and in 1978 she moved to the Heron Motor Group at the invitation of Gerald Ronson. From 1980 she became the managing director of a car rental company until she became the most powerful female in the British car industry when she became the director of public relations for the Austin Rover group. In 1987, she was Director of the public relations company Burson-Marsteller.

In 1991 she was appointed a Commander of the Order of the British Empire. In 1992 she was created a life peeress, as Baroness Denton of Wakefield, of Wakefield in the County of West Yorkshire. She served as a Baroness-in-Waiting from 1991–2. She was Parliamentary Under-Secretary of State at the Department of Trade and Industry from 1992–3, at the Department of Energy from 1993–4, and at the Northern Ireland Office from 1994–7. After the 1997 general election, she served as the Conservative opposition spokesman on Trade and Industry in the House of Lords.

She was co-founder of Forum UK, the British section of the International Forum for Women and President (President) of the organization Women on the Move against Cancer.

References 

1935 births
2001 deaths
Alumni of the London School of Economics
British sportsperson-politicians
Commanders of the Order of the British Empire
Conservative Party (UK) Baronesses- and Lords-in-Waiting
Conservative Party (UK) life peers
Life peeresses created by Elizabeth II
20th-century British women politicians
Northern Ireland Office junior ministers
People from Wakefield
British female racing drivers